Jelena Bodražić (born 1971) is a mezzo-soprano opera and concert singer born in Bačka Palanka, Serbia.

References 

20th-century Serbian women opera singers
1971 births
Serbian mezzo-sopranos
Living people
People from Bačka Palanka
21st-century Serbian women opera singers
Date of birth missing (living people)